Almost Che (also known as Iron Dae-oh: The Nation's Iron Bag!) is a 2012 South Korean comedy film directed and written by Yook Sang-hyo. It was released on October 25, 2012.

Cast
Kim In-kwon as Kang Dae-oh
Yoo Da-in as Seo Ye-rin
Jo Jung-suk as Hwang Yeong-min
Park Cheol-min as Hwang Bi-hong
Kwon Hyun-sang as Nam-jeong
Kim Ki-bang as Bong-soo
Oh Hee-joon as Riot police
Shin Hyun-bin as Site reporter (Cameo)
 Cha Chung-hwa as Dong-sook

References

External links
Almost Che at Lotte Entertainment

 

2012 comedy films
2012 films
South Korean comedy films
2010s Korean-language films
Lotte Entertainment films
2010s South Korean films